The Washington Indoor was a men's tennis tournament played in Washington D.C.  The event was played as part of the WCT Tour from 1972–1976 and the Grand Prix circuit from 1977–1980. It was played on indoor carpet courts.

Finals

Singles

Doubles

See also
 Washington Open

External links
 ATP results archive

Carpet court tennis tournaments
Indoor tennis tournaments
Grand Prix tennis circuit
Sports in Washington, D.C.
Defunct tennis tournaments in the United States
World Championship Tennis
1972 establishments in Washington, D.C.
1980 disestablishments in Washington, D.C.